Vadé is a British a cappella R&B quintet formed by Philip Yeboah and JJ Hammersley in the summer of 2013. The band's musical influences include Boyz II Men, Naturally 7 and Take 6.          

Vadé produce covers of songs across a range of genres, medleys and original material.          

The group has worked with Gregory Porter, Beverley Knight, Geri Halliwell, Katy B and Shaun Escoffrey. Vadé won Sky One's talent competition Sing: Ultimate A Cappella 2017 presented by Cat Deeley, which landed them a major recording deal with Decca Records.  Their debut studio album, Cry Your Heart Out was recorded at Abbey Road Studios and the title track was written by  One Direction's Niall Horan.

Vadé won the title of 'Best Quintet' at the a cappella Music Awards in 2018.                 

Vadé are members of the Seventh-day Adventist Church.

Discography

Members 
 Jermaine Sanderson - First Tenor (2013 - Present)
 Philip Yeboah - Second Tenor (2013 - Present)
 Roy Crisp - Third Tenor 
(2013 - Present)
 Emmanuel Ayeni - Baritone 
(2021 - present)
 Joshua 'JJ' Hammerlsey - Bass (2013 - Present)

Former members
 Samuel Acquah – Baritone (2013–2015)

 Joseph Anti - Baritone (2015 - 2021)

References

External links 
 Official Website

A cappella musical groups
British jazz ensembles
British contemporary R&B musical groups